Biloxi Wildlife Management Area, also referred to as Biloxi WMA, is a 42,747 acre privately owned tract of protected marsh land located in St. Bernard Parish, Louisiana, managed by the Louisiana Department of Wildlife and Fisheries (LDWF). Access is limited to boats as there are no roads in the WMA. The nearest road access is LA 46 to Shell Beach or LA 624 to Hopedale.

WMA land acquisition
The land is owned by Biloxi Marsh Lands Corporation that first entered into leasing arrangements with the LDWF in 1957. The company retains the exclusive right to conduct mineral exploration as well as other business interests on the property. The LDWF now manages 42,747 acres

Location
The land is considered brackish to saline marsh

See also
List of Louisiana Wildlife Management Areas

References

Wildlife management areas of Louisiana
Protected areas of Louisiana
Geography of Allen Parish, Louisiana
Protected areas established in 1957
1957 establishments in Louisiana